Kushaldeep Singh Dhillon (born 21 May 1973) is an Indian Politician affiliated with Indian National Congress. He is a member of Punjab Legislative Assembly representing Faridkot.

References 

Living people
1973 births
Indian National Congress politicians from Punjab, India
Punjab, India MLAs 2017–2022